Tarfala Valley (Swedish: Tarfaladalen or Tarfalavagge, Northern Sami: Darfalvággi) is a valley in Kiruna Municipality, Sweden. Several glaciers flow into the valley and glaciological research has been conducted since 1946 at the Tarfala scientific station.

See also
Kebnekaise
Tarfala research station
Storglaciären
Isfallsglaciären
Kebnepakteglaciären

References

Valleys of Sweden
Kiruna
Landforms of Norrbotten County